A kisser is one who kisses.

Kisser or Kissers may also refer to:

 Kisser (surname)
 Kissers is a term used for the Followers of Christ church and its members
 Kissers and Killers is an album name from The Choir (alternative rock band)
 slang for Mouth or Face

See also
The Kiss (disambiguation)
Kiss Kiss (disambiguation)